The Mona coqui, coqui de la Mona or coqui de Mona (Eleutherodactylus monensis), is a species of frog in the family Eleutherodactylidae  endemic to Mona, Puerto Rico.
Its natural habitats are subtropical or tropical dry forest and subtropical or tropical dry shrubland.

See also

List of amphibians and reptiles of Puerto Rico
Fauna of Puerto Rico
List of endemic fauna of Puerto Rico

References

Eleutherodactylus
Amphibians of Puerto Rico
Endemic fauna of Puerto Rico
Amphibians described in 1901
Taxonomy articles created by Polbot